Rui Baltazar dos Santos Alves (born 1933) is a Mozambican lawyer, politician, and university professor who was an active supporter of FRELIMO during the Mozambican War of Independence.

Biography
Baltazar was born in Lourenço Marques (today Maputo) to a Portuguese Mozambican family. During colonial rule, he used his position as an attorney to defend political prisoners of the Portuguese authorities, and upon independence was appointed the first Minister of Justice People's Republic of Mozambique. In 1975, he also helped draft the Constitution of the newly independent nation. In 1978, he was appointed Minister of Finance, a position he held until 1986. In April 1986, he became rector of Eduardo Mondlane University, where he taught human rights law. He was also a member of the Mozambique Parliament from 1975 to 1992 and was Mozambique's representative to the EEC-ACP assembly. He signed the Lomé Convention on behalf of Mozambique in 1986.

In 1994, Baltazar was nominated as the Mozambican ambassador to Sweden, Denmark, and Norway and in 2002 became special advisor to the President of the SADC.

References

1933 births
Government ministers of Mozambique
Finance ministers of Mozambique
Mozambican people of Portuguese descent
Mozambican communists
Living people
FRELIMO politicians